Kerry Danielle Ingram (born 26 May 1999) is an English actress, known for her roles as Shireen Baratheon in the HBO series Game of Thrones and Rebecca 'Becky' Sidebottom in the Netflix series Free Rein.

Career

Before being cast in Matilda, Ingram played a workhouse child in Oliver! at the Theatre Royal, Drury Lane. From November 2010 to January 2011 she played the title role in the Royal Shakespeare Company's Matilda the Musical in Stratford-upon-Avon. She was the only original Matilda transferred to the West End cast, where she shared the role with three other girls at the Cambridge Theatre. In April 2012, just after departing the show, she received an Olivier Award for Best Actress in a Musical. After completing Matilda, she played a small role in Tom Hooper's film adaptation of Les Miserables.

From 2013 to 2015, Ingram portrayed Shireen Baratheon in the third through fifth seasons of HBO's fantasy TV series Game of Thrones. In 2013, she appeared at the Doctor Who Prom as the Queen of Years, where she sang "The Rings of Akhaten" with Allan Clayton. Other roles include Lois Wren in an episode of Doctors, and a role in the BBC adaptation of Wolf Hall alongside Mark Rylance and Damian Lewis. From 2017 to 2019 Ingram portrayed series regular Rebecca "Becky" Sidebottom in the Daytime Emmy award-winning Netflix original Free Rein and also reprised the role for two special film episodes.

Personal life 
Kerry Danielle Ingram is of Maltese descent, with her grandfather being from Mqabba. Ingram lives in Warfield. Ingram has a form of osteogenesis imperfecta; having regularly fractured her bones, she requires periodic infusions to increase her bone mass. She received her Maltese citizenship in September 2020.

Filmography

Film

Television

Theatre

Radio

Awards and nominations

References

External links

 

1999 births
Living people
21st-century English actresses
English child actresses
English musical theatre actresses
English people of Maltese descent
English television actresses
Laurence Olivier Award winners
People from Slough
People with osteogenesis imperfecta